San Juan is a small village in northwestern Argentina. It is part of the Iruya Department in the Salta Province, located 7 km north of the Iruya village, 4 km northeast of the village of San Isidro and 4 km west of the village of Chiyayoc.

San Juan is part of Finca El Potrero. The village lives from tourism and agriculture. In San Juan potatoes and corn are grown and geese, goats and sheep are raised.
San Juan is accessible from Iruya by walking in about five hours, in parts via a steep footpath.

Events
The festival of the local saint takes place on 2 February.

References

External links
 Photo #1 of San Juan
 Photo #2 of San Juan

Populated places in Salta Province